La lupa is Italian for "the she-wolf", a female wolf.

La lupa can refer to the mythological she-wolf that suckled Romulus and Remus and became a symbol of the city of Rome.

La lupa Capitolina is the Italian name of the Capitoline Wolf, the famous statue of the mythical she-wolf in the National Museum of Rome.


Films
 La lupa, a 1953 film adaptation by Alberto Lattuada of Giovanni Verga's short story 
 La lupa, a 1955 film by Luis Lucia
 La lupa, a 1996 film adaptation by Gabriele Lavia of Giovanni Verga's short story 
 La Lupa, a 1996 soundtrack album by Ennio Morricone, and its theme track
 La lupa mannara, a 1976 Italian film

Literature and media
 La Lupa (magazine), an early fascist magazine founded by Paolo Orano
 La Lupa (story), a short story by Giovanni Verga
 La Lupa (Swiss singer), artist

Other uses
Acca Larentia (Roman mythology), the adopted mother of Romulus and Remus, and by some accounts a prostitute ("lupa")
 A nickname of Anna Magnani, Italian stage and film actress

See also
 Lupa (disambiguation)
 She-wolf (disambiguation)
 Romulus and Remus